Walter Charles Cassidy (January 31, 1901 – December 27, 1944) was a player in the National Football League. He played with the Kenosha Maroons during the 1924 NFL season.

Cassidy enlisted in the Army in Toledo on July 27, 1942. He joined the Army Air Forces and rose to the rank of staff sergeant. On December 27, 1944, Cassidy was one of three fatalities aboard a Douglas C-47 Skytrain when it crashed into the English Channel.

References

1901 births
1944 deaths
Kenosha Maroons players
Detroit Titans football players
Players of American football from Youngstown, Ohio
United States Army Air Forces personnel killed in World War II
United States Army Air Forces non-commissioned officers
Missing in action of World War II